Elma Nfor (born 17 December 1995) is a Cameroonian footballer who last played as a forward for Union Omaha in USL League One.

References

External links
 
 Wingate Bulldogs profile

1995 births
Living people
Cameroonian footballers
Cameroonian expatriate footballers
Association football forwards
Lansing Ignite FC players
USL League One players
National Premier Soccer League players
Cameroonian expatriate sportspeople in the United States
Wingate Bulldogs men's soccer players
Spartanburg Methodist Pioneers men's soccer players
Union Omaha players
Soccer players from Kentucky